Sand Run is an unincorporated community in Ward Township, Hocking County, Ohio, United States.

History
Sand Run was laid out in 1880. A post office was established at Sand Run in 1881, and remained in operation until 1909.

References

Populated places in Hocking County, Ohio